The Malani Express is an Express train belonging to Northern Railway zone that runs between  and Barmer in India. It is currently being operated with 14659/14660 train numbers on a daily basis.

Service

Coach composition

The train has standard ICF rakes with a maximum speed of 110 km/h. The train consists of 18 coaches:

 1 First AC and Second AC
 2 AC II Tier
 3 AC III Tier
 8 Sleeper coaches
 5 General
 4 Seating cum Luggage Rake

Traction

Both trains are hauled by an Abu Road Loco Shed-based WDM-3A diesel locomotive from Old Delhi to Jodhpur. From Jodhpur, trains are hauled by an Abu Road Loco Shed-based WDM-3A diesel locomotive to Jaisalmer, and return.

Direction reversal

Train reverses its direction 2 times:

Rake sharing

The train shares its rake with 14646/14645 Shalimar Express and 14661/14662 Delhi–Barmer Link Express.

See also 

 Jaisalmer railway station
 Old Delhi railway station
 Shalimar Express

Notes

References

External links 

 14659/Malani Express
 14660/Malani Express

Transport in Delhi
Transport in Jaisalmer
Named passenger trains of India
Rail transport in Delhi
Rail transport in Haryana
Rail transport in Rajasthan
Express trains in India
Transport in Barmer, Rajasthan